A loitering munition (also known as a suicide drone or kamikaze drone) is an aerial weapon system category in which the munition loiters (waits passively) around the target area for some time and attacks only once a target is located. Loitering munitions enable faster reaction times against concealed or hidden targets that emerge for short periods without placing high-value platforms close to the target area, and also allow more selective targeting as the attack can easily be aborted.

Loitering munitions fit in the niche between cruise missiles and unmanned combat aerial vehicles (UCAVs), sharing characteristics with both. They differ from cruise missiles in that they are designed to loiter for a relatively long time around the target area, and from UCAVs in that a loitering munition is intended to be expended in an attack and has a built-in warhead. As such, they can also be considered a nontraditional ranged weapon. 

Loitering weapons first emerged in the 1980s for use in the Suppression of Enemy Air Defenses (SEAD) role against surface-to-air missiles (SAMs), and were deployed in that role with a number of military forces in the 1990s. Starting in the 2000s, loitering weapons were developed for additional roles ranging from relatively long-range strikes and fire support down to tactical, very short range battlefield systems that fit in a backpack.

History

First development and terminology 
Initially, loitering munitions were not referred to as such but rather as 'suicide UAVs' or 'loitering missiles'. Different sources point at different projects as originating the weapon category. The early 1980s initial Israeli Delilah variants or the failed US AGM-136 Tacit Rainbow program are mentioned by some sources. Alternatively, the late 1980s IAI Harpy which was widely exported is considered by some as the first loitering munition system. Whereas the Iranian Ababil-1 was produced in the 1980s but its exact production date is unknown.

Early projects did not use the "loitering munition" nomenclature that emerged much later, and used terminology existing at the time. For instance the AGM-136 Tacit Rainbow was described in a 1988  article:

Initial role in suppression of enemy air defense

The response to the first generation of fixed installation surface-to-air missiles (SAMs) such as S-75 and S-125 was the development of the anti-radiation missile such as AGM-45 Shrike and other means to attack fixed SAM installations, as well as developing SEAD doctrines. The Soviet counter-response was the use of mobile SAMs such as 2K12 Kub with intermittent use of radar. Thus, the SAM battery was only visible for a small period of time, during which it was also a significant threat to high-value Wild Weasel fighters. In 1982 Operation Mole Cricket 19 various means including UAVs and air-launched Samson decoys were used over suspected SAM areas to saturate enemy SAMs and to bait them to activate their radar systems, which were then attacked by anti-radiation missiles.

In the 1980s, a number of programs, such as the IAI Harpy or the AGM-136 Tacit Rainbow, integrated anti-radiation sensors into a drone or missile air frames coupled with command and control and loitering capabilities. This allowed the attacking force to place relatively cheap munitions in place over suspected SAM sites, and to attack promptly the moment the SAM battery is visible. This integrated the use of a drone as a baiting decoy with the attack role into one small and relatively cheap platform in comparison to the alternative wild weasel jet fighter.

Evolution into additional roles

Starting in the 2000s, loitering weapons have been developed for additional roles beyond the initial SEAD role ranging from relatively long-range strikes and fire support down to tactical, very short-range battlefield use such as the AeroVironment Switchblade which is deployed at the platoon level and fits in a backpack. A documented use of loitering munitions was in 2016 Nagorno-Karabakh conflict in which an IAI Harop was used against a bus functioning as a troop transport for Armenian soldiers.

Characteristics

Loitering munitions may be as simple as an unmanned aerial vehicle (UAV) with attached explosives that is sent on a potential kamikaze mission, and may even be constructed with off the shelf commercial quadcopters with strapped on explosives.

Purpose-built munitions are more elaborate in flight and control capabilities, warhead size and design, and on-board sensors for locating targets. Some loitering munitions use a human operator to locate targets whereas others, such as IAI Harop, can function autonomously searching and launching attacks without human intervention. Another example is UVision HERO solutions – the loitering systems are operated remotely, controlled in real time by a communications system and equipped with an electro-optical camera whose images are received by the command and control station.

Some loitering munitions may return and be recovered by the operator if they are unused in an attack and have enough fuel; in particular this is characteristic of UAVs with a secondary explosive capability. Other systems, such as the Delilah don't have a recovery option and are self-destructed in mission aborts.

Countermeasures

Comparison to similar weapons
Loitering munitions fit in the niche between cruise missiles and unmanned combat aerial vehicles (UCAVs).

The following table compares similar size-class cruise missiles, loitering munitions, and UCAVS:

Whereas some cruise missiles, such as the block IV Tomahawk, have the ability to loiter and have some sensory and remote control features, their primary mission is typically strike and not target acquisition. Cruise missiles, as their name implies, are optimized for long-range flight at constant speed both in terms of propulsion systems and wings or lifting body design. They are often unable to loiter at slow fuel-efficient speeds which significantly reduces potential loiter time even when the missile has some loiter capabilities.

Conversely almost any UAV could be piloted to crash onto a target and most could be fitted with an improvised explosive warhead. However the primary use of a UAV or UCAV would be for recoverable flight operations carrying reconnaissance equipment and/or munitions. While many UAVs are explicitly designed with loitering in mind, they are not optimized for a diving attack, often lacking forward facing cameras, lacking in control response-speed which is unneeded in regular UAV flight, and are noisy when diving, potentially providing warning to the target. UAV's, being designed as multi-use platforms, often have a unit cost that is not appropriate for regular one-time expendable mission use.

The primary mission of a loitering munition is reaching the suspected target area, target acquisition during a loitering phase, followed by a self-destructive strike, and the munition is optimized in this regard in terms of characteristics (e.g. very short engine life time, silence in strike phase, speed of strike dive, optimization toward loitering time instead of range/speed) and unit cost (appropriate for a one-off strike mission).

Ethical and international humanitarian law concerns

Loitering munitions that are capable of making autonomous attack decisions (man out of the loop) raise moral, ethical, and international humanitarian law concerns because a human being is not involved in making the actual decision to attack and potentially kill humans, as is the case with fire-and-forget missiles in common use since the 1960s. Whereas some guided munitions may lock-on after launch or may be sensor fuzed, their flight time is typically limited and a human launches them at an area where enemy activity is strongly suspected, as is the case with modern fire-and-forget missiles and airstrike planning. An autonomous loitering munition, on the other hand, may be launched at an area where enemy activity is only probable, and loiter searching autonomously for targets for potentially hours following the initial launch decision, though it may be able to request final authorization for an attack from a human. The IAI Harpy and IAI Harop are frequently cited in the relevant literature as they set a precedent for an aerial system (though not necessarily a precedent when comparing to a modern naval mine) in terms of length and quality of autonomous function, in relation to a cruise missile for example.

Users and producers 
As of 2023, loitering munitions are used by the armed forces of several countries, including: 

 – At the end of December 2022, Argentina announced the purchase of HERO 30 and HERO 120 loitering munitions from the Israeli company UVision Air.
 – domestically produced HRESH, BEEB 1800
 – Drone 40
 – IAI Harpy, IAI Harop, Orbiter 1K, SkyStriker, STM Kargu, Qirği, Quzgün
 – UBAK-25 Chekan
 – IAI Harpy, CH-901, WS-43, ASN-301
 – Rajata
 – IAI Harpy, IAI Harop, SkyStriker, Warmate, Trinetra, Nagastra series, ALS-50, Sierra Tango
 – Shahed 131, Shahed 136, Hesa Ababil-2, Raad 85, Arash-2, Meraj-521 and possibly others
 – IAI Harpy, IAI Harop, IAI Harpy NG, IAI Green Dragon, IAI Rotem L, Orbiter 1K, Delilah, SkyStriker, Spike Firefly, HERO loitering munitions series, Viper, Lanius, Point Blank.
Indigenous manufacture of additional types by Israel Aerospace Industries, UVision Air, Aeronautics Defense Systems, Elbit Systems, Rafael Advanced Defense Systems and Israel Military Industries 
  – Switchblade
 – IAI Harop
 – WB Electronics Warmate
 – KUB-BLA ("Cube"), ZALA Lancet, Geran-1, Geran-2, Boomerang 
 – Gavran
 – IAI harop
 – AX-2 Predator
 – Paramount N-Raven
 – Devil Killer, IAI Harpy
 - Q-SLAM-40
 – Kamin-25
 – NCSIST Chien Hsiang, NCSIST Fire Cardinal
 – IAI Harpy, STM Kargu,  STM Alpagu, Transvaro-Havelsan Fedai, LENTATEK Kargı, Roketsan-STM Alpagut
 – SkyStriker
 – QX-1, Hunter SP, Hunter 2-S, Hunter 5, Hunter 10, Shadow 25, Shadow 50, RW-24, N-Raven
 – Switchblade
 – AeroVironment Switchblade, Phoenix Ghost, Raytheon Coyote, Hero-120, Point Blank.
 – RAM II, Switchblade, ST-35 Silent Thunder, Phoenix Ghost, Warmate
 – (Houthis) – Qasef-1/2K, Shahed 131, Shahed 136, Samad-2/3

See also
 Flying bomb 
 XM501 Non-Line-of-Sight Launch System
 Boeing Persistent Munition Technology Demonstrator
 Low Cost Autonomous Attack System

References

 
Emerging technologies
Military technology
Military equipment
Weapon development
Aerial warfare